Montaño is a Spanish-language surname, related, but pronounced differently, to the Italian surname Montano and French surname Montaigne. The name Montano also occurs without the "ny" sound ñ as Montano in Spain. Notable people with the surname include:

 Alysia Montaño née Johnson, American track and field athlete, 800 metres national champion
 Cristian Montaño, Colombian football player
 Gabriela Montaño (born 1975), Bolivian physician and politician
 Miguel Montaño (born 1991), Colombian footballer who plays for Seattle Sounders FC 
 Víctor Montaño (born 1984), Colombian football player

See also
 Montano, Italian surname

Spanish-language surnames